This is the list of the 54 members of the European Parliament for Poland in the 2004 to 2009 session.

List

External links
 Polish delegation of the Socialist group.

2004
List
Poland